Bear Creek is a tributary of Peters Creek in San Mateo County, California in the United States.

References

See also
List of watercourses in the San Francisco Bay Area

Rivers of San Mateo County, California
Rivers of Northern California